Live at the Sands (Before Frank) is a live album by the pianist and bandleader Count Basie with performances recorded in Las Vegas in 1966 at the same concerts that produced Frank Sinatra's 1966 album Sinatra at the Sands. It was released on the Reprise label in 1998. The album is of the warm-up sets by Basie's band before Sinatra's performances.

Reception

AllMusic awarded the album 3 stars stating "this is overall a legendary band doing a somewhat less-than-legendary set, during some gigs that, in fairness, yielded up a great live album elsewhere. The quality is solid live sound, in crisp stereo from a nicely controlled mid-'60s venue, using state-of-the-art equipment". On All About Jazz, Ed Kopp noted, "The mid-'60s are regarded as a creative low point for the Count Basie Orchestra, but this live recording proves that the Basie band was as stylish and swingin' as ever in 1966, though fewer folks were paying attention."

Track listing
 Introduction – 0:48
 "Splanky" (Neal Hefti) – 3:52
 "I Can't Stop Loving You" (Don Gibson) – 3:41
 "I Needs to Be Bee'd With" (Quincy Jones, Ernest Shelby) – 3:52
 "Flight of the Foo Birds" (Hefti) – 3:08
 "Satin Doll" (Duke Ellington, Billy Strayhorn, Johnny Mercer) – 4:10
 "Makin' Whoopee!" (Walter Donaldson, Gus Kahn) – 4:11
 "Corner Pocket" (Freddie Green) – 5:33
 "One O'Clock Jump" (Count Basie) – 2:18
 "Go Away Little Girl" (Gerry Goffin, Carole King) – 3:30
 "Whirly Bird" (Hefti) – 5:11
 "Blues for Ilene" (Eric Dixon) – 6:03
 "This Could Be the Start of Something Big" (Steve Allen) – 3:10
 "Jumpin' at the Woodside" (Andrew York) – 3:33

Personnel 
Count Basie – piano
Al Aarons, Sonny Cohn, Wallace Davenport, Phil Guilbeau, Harry Edison – trumpet 
Al Grey, Henderson Chambers, Grover Mitchell – trombone
Bill Hughes – bass trombone
Marshal Royal – alto saxophone, clarinet 
Bobby Plater – alto saxophone, flute
Eric Dixon – tenor saxophone, flute
Eddie "Lockjaw" Davis – tenor saxophone
Charlie Fowlkes – baritone saxophone
Freddie Green – guitar
Norman Keenan  – double bass
Sonny Payne – drums
Quincy Jones – arranger, conducting

References 

1998 live albums
Count Basie Orchestra live albums
Reprise Records live albums
Albums produced by Matt Pierson
Albums arranged by Quincy Jones
Albums conducted by Quincy Jones
Albums recorded at the Sands Hotel